The 2018 Brant municipal election took place on October 22, 2018. Seven-term incumbent Ronald Eddy lost re-election to businessman David Bailey. Bailey is the first openly gay mayor of Brant.

Mayoral candidates 
Ronald Eddy, incumbent mayor and former MPP for Brant—Haldimand
David Bailey, businessman
Don Cardy, Brant County Councillor for Ward 2
Shawn Pratt, businessman

Results

Mayor

Brant County Council
Two to be elected from each ward.  The results for Brant County Council are as follows:

School board trustees

English trustees
{|
|valign=top width=10%|

French trustee
{|
|valign=top width=10%|

References

Notes

Brant 
County of Brant